Mékinac is a regional county municipality (MRC) in the administrative region of Mauricie, in the province of Quebec, Canada. Its seat is Saint-Tite. It is composed of 10 municipalities and 4 unorganized territories.

Toponymy
According to the Commission de Toponymie du Québec, the name Mekinac, pronounced /mekinak/ in French, has an Algonquin origin, that means "turtle". Native Americans often designated places based on the name of the animal kingdom. Once known, the toponym allowed to refer to the same place in conversations. Mikinak designation was assigned to a nearby mountain. A second thesis refers to the abundance of turtles in the area. However, the name is also similar to the historical Algonquin word mekanâc, pronounced /me:kana:ʃ/, meaning "small path". The toponym Mekinac was assigned to the Mékinac River, Mékinac Lake, at Mékinac (township), in the ex-municipality of Saint-Joseph-de-Mékinac, Quebec, and town of Saint-Roch-de-Mékinac.

History
Mékinac MRC was created on January 1, 1982.

Subdivisions
There are 14 subdivisions within the RCM:

Cities & Towns (1)
 Saint-Tite

Municipalities (3)
 Notre-Dame-de-Montauban
 Sainte-Thècle
 Trois-Rives

Parishes (5)
 Hérouxville
 Lac-aux-Sables
 Saint-Adelphe
 Saint-Roch-de-Mékinac
 Saint-Séverin

Villages (1)
 Grandes-Piles

Unorganized Territory (4)
 Lac-Boulé
 Lac-Masketsi
 Lac-Normand
 Rivière-de-la-Savane

Municipalities of MRC Mékinac 

Between 2006 and 2011, the population grew by 2.0%. The MRC has 8,237 private dwellings whose 6,096 private dwellings are occupied by usual residents. The median age of the population is 52.6 years old. Statistics Canada reports that in 2011, 88.5% of the population was aged 15 and over, meanings 11,430 individuals (including 5700 men and 5730 women), divided into 3,940 private households. This census indicates that 2,070 people lived alone. Of this population, 1,880 individuals have mastered both French and English, or 14.6%.

Transportation

Access routes
Highways and numbered routes that run through the municipality, including external routes that start or finish at the county border:

 Autoroutes
 None

 Principal Highways
 
 
 

 Secondary Highways
 
 
 

 External Routes
 None

See also
 List of regional county municipalities and equivalent territories in Quebec
 Batiscanie, Quebec
 Batiscan River
 Rivière des Envies
 North Mékinac River
 South Mékinac River
 Rivière du milieu (Mékinac)
 Rivière aux eaux mortes (Mékinac)
 Tawachiche River
 Tawachiche West River
 Pierre-Paul River
 Saint-Maurice River
 Mékinac River
 Mékinac Lake
 Missionary Lake
 Lake Jesuit
 Lake Traverse (Mékinac)
 Regional County Municipality
 Irénée-Marie Ecological Reserve
 Grande-Anse (Mékinac) (hamlet)

References